BearCity 2: The Proposal is a 2012 American gay-themed (in particular, the bear community) comedy-drama film written and directed by Doug Langway. It is a sequel to his 2010 film BearCity.

In addition to the major characters from the original BearCity, the cast includes Richard Riehle and Susie Mosher as Tyler's parents, and Kathy Najimy as Brent's mother.

BearCity 3 was funded by an Indiegogo crowdfunding campaign, and had a limited release at various LGBT festivals and venues in 2016, and received a full release digitally and on home media in 2017.

Premise
Following the legalization of same-sex marriage in New York, Roger proposes to his boyfriend Tyler, and the gang embarks on a road trip to have the wedding in Provincetown, Massachusetts during "Bear Week".

Cast

Gerald McCullouch as Roger
Joe Conti as Tyler
Stephen Guarino as Brent
Brian Keane as Fred
Gregory Gunter as Michael
James Martinez as Carlos
Alex Di Dio as Simon
Aaron Tone as Nate
T. Doyle Leverett as Big Dan
Susan Mosher as Rachel
Jason Stuart as Scott
Kevin Smith as himself
Richard Riehle as Gabe
Kathy Najimy as Rose
Frank DeCaro as himself

Release
The film was screened at the Los Angeles Gay and Lesbian Film Festival and Philadelphia QFest in July 2012, before going into general release on September 28. It was subsequently released on DVD and Blu-ray on December 5, 2012 by SharpLeft Studios, and was made available as a digital download on January 11, 2013.

References

External links

Official Site

2012 comedy-drama films
2012 LGBT-related films
2012 films
American independent films
American LGBT-related films
Bear (gay culture)
Films shot in Massachusetts
Films shot in New York City
LGBT-related comedy-drama films
Films set in Massachusetts
Films set in New York City
American comedy-drama films
Gay-related films
2010s English-language films
2010s American films